The cobza (also cobsa, cobuz, koboz) is a multi-stringed instrument of the lute family of folk origin popular in the Romanian folklore from both Romania and Republic of Moldova (it is considered the oldest accompaniment instrument in the region). It is also used in the Hungarian Táncház movement (end of the 20th Century).

It is distinct from the Ukrainian Kobza, an instrument of different construction and origin.

Overview 

The Romanian Cobza is metal-strung (although modern nylon-strung models exist, mostly in Hungary), and has a very short neck without frets (although a newer fretted cobza can be found in the Republic of Moldova), with a bent-back pegbox. The back is ribbed. It is usually double or triple strung, and often has a characteristic flat end clasp.

The Cobza is played with a plectrum (traditionally, a goose feather) in elaborate and florid melodic passagework, and has a pick-guard similar to that of an oud. Its strings are widely spaced at the bridge to facilitate this technique. It has a soft tone, most often tuned to D-A-D-G (although tuning depends on style, region and player).

The origins of the Romanian Cobza are thought to be a local adaptation of the Persian barbat or Turkish oud, probably brought to the area by itinerant Romani musicians in the 15th century (a Rom/Romani musician is called lăutar, literally lute-player). A Cobza player specifically is called a "cobzar". Notable Cobza players were Ion Păturică, Ion Zlotea, Marin Cotoanță, Grigore Kiazim (from Wallachia), Nicolae Păsnicuțu and Constantin Negel (from Moldavia).

It is said that the Cobza was also played in the 19th Century by Jewish musicians from Moldavia region. It seems that Cobza was also used in various music ensembles in the Bukovina region in the mid-war periods, being replaced totally by the mandolin and 4 stringed domra when the north of this area became incorporated into the Ukrainian SSR.

The name of the instrument may come from the Turkic "kopuz".

References

External links

Cobza solo - Marin Cotoanță
Countryside built Cobza recording
"Datina" folk ensemble from Botoșani
Robert Garfias - field recordings made in Romania during 1977
A Romanian Cobza in Museum Collections
Romanian Cobza in Museum Collections
Romanian Cobza from Horniman Museum - on the left
 http://www.koboziskola.hu/

Necked bowl lutes
Romanian musical instruments
Moldovan musical instruments
Hungarian musical instruments